Christine Nee is an American children's television screenwriter and producer. Nee is best known as the creator of Doc McStuffins, which she conceived as Cheers for preschoolers. She has previously worked as an associate producer on several international versions of Sesame Street.

Career
Nee said that while she did not originally connect with any shows because she did not see herself "represented onscreen," she first tried to be an actor. Realizing she couldn't fit in, she worked on scripts for Blue's Clues in 2001 and Wonder Pets, continuing to work as a producer, the latter on Deadliest Catch for two episodes.

Nee conceived of her award-winning show, Doc McStuffins while in the shower after her son had visited the doctor for asthma a few days before. It was her idea to make the lead character female and she readily agreed when Nancy Kanter, the creative head of Disney Junior, suggested that she should be African-American. Although some at Disney were hesitant originally that a show with a female lead "might not have mass appeal," this did not deter Kanter, and within a year of the show's release in 2012, "merchandise generated about $500 million in sales." Nee said she was very pleased that her character had unusual background for a TV character, and hoped this would influence the next generation.

Nee was the executive producer of a Disney Junior series, Vampirina, based on the children's picture book Vampirina Ballerina. The series, which featured many of the same staff who worked on Doc McStuffins, premiered on October 1, 2017, and ended on June 28, 2021 after 3 seasons and 75 episodes during its 4-year run.

In April 2019, Nee joined other WGA writers in firing their agents as part of the WGA's stand against the ATA and the practice of packaging.

On July 4, 2021, a 10-part series of animated music videos, which Nee created, titled We the People, premiered on Netflix. Kenya Barris was also a showrunner and the series was produced by Michelle Obama and Barack Obama. On July 13, 2021, Ridley Jones, an animated series meant for children, is set to debut on the same network. It is part of a slate of animated preschool series on the streaming service, with others including Spirit Rangers, and Ada Twist, Scientist, of which Nee is the showrunner. Dino Daycare was originally part of this slate.

On April 29, 2022, it was announced Dino Daycare was scrapped.

Personal life
Nee is of Irish descent. At age 18, during the 1980s, Nee came out as lesbian. In June 2021, she described herself as a gay and "relatively butch" woman. She has one child, a son.

Filmography

Television

Streaming television

References

External links
 

Living people
21st-century American writers
American people of Irish descent
American women screenwriters
American television directors
American television producers
American television writers
American lesbian writers
Place of birth missing (living people)
Year of birth missing (living people)
LGBT producers
American LGBT screenwriters
American LGBT rights activists
Showrunners
American women television writers
Sesame Street crew
Peabody Award winners
21st-century American women writers
American women television producers
American women television directors